Cucumber green spider may refer to one of several species of spider in the genus Araniella including:

Araniella cucurbitina
Araniella opisthographa

Set index articles on spiders